Development or developing may refer to:

Arts 
Development hell, when a project is stuck in development
Filmmaking, development phase, including finance and budgeting
Development (music), the process thematic material is reshaped
Photographic development
Development (album), a 2002 album by Nonpoint

Business
Business development, a process of growing a business
Career development
Corporate development, a position in a business
Energy development, activities concentrated on obtaining energy from natural resources
Green development, a real estate concept that considers social and environmental impact of development
Land development, altering the landscape in any number of ways
Land development bank, a kind of bank in India
Leadership development
New product development
Organization development
Professional development
Real estate development
Research and development
Training and development
Fundraising, also called "development"

Biology and medicine
 Adult development, between adolescence and the end of life
 Child development, between birth and the end of adolescence
 Development (journal), an academic journal in developmental biology
 Developmental biology, the study of the process by which organisms grow and develop
 Developmental psychology, the scientific study of how and why human beings change over the course of their life
 Drug development, the entire process of bringing a new drug or device to the market
 Embryogenesis, or development, the process by which the embryo is formed
 Human development (biology), the process of growing to maturity
 Neural development, the processes that generate, shape, and reshape the nervous system
 Personal development, or self-help
 Prenatal development, the process in which a human embryo or fetus gestates during pregnancy
 Tooth development or odontogenesis
 Youth development

Computing
Artificial development, an area of computer science and engineering
Software development, the development of a software product
Web development, work involved in developing a web site
Mobile app development, act or process by which a mobile app is developed
Video game development

Social science
 Community development, practices to improve various aspects of communities
Development communication
 Developing country, a nation with a lesser developed industrial base 
 Development aid,  financial aid given by governments and other agencies 
 Development geography, a branch of geography which refers to the standard of living and quality of life of inhabitants
 Development studies, examines socioeconomic growth and development, especially in developing countries, and may overlap with postcolonial studies 
Development theory
 Economic development, the process by which a nation improves the economic, political, and social well-being of its people
 European Development Fund, the main instrument for European Union (EU) aid for development 
 Human Development Index, used to rank countries by level of human development
 Human development (humanity), the science that seeks to understand how and why people of all ages and circumstances change or remain the same over time
 International development, usually level of economic development
 Regional development, aid and assistance to regions which are less economically developed
 Rural development, the process of improving the quality of life and economic well-being of people living in rural areas
 Sociocultural evolution, how cultures and societies have changed over time
Sustainable development

Other uses
Development (differential geometry), rolling one smooth surface over another
Development (topology), a countable collection of open coverings
Development, a term used in chess
Development of doctrine, a term used by John Henry Newman to describe Catholic teachings
Driver development program, a program used by racing teams to develop younger drivers

See also
Develop (disambiguation)
Elaboration